The Krabue buffalo (Thai: กระบือ; (krabue) being the Thai word for "water buffalo") also known as the Siamese buffalo, Thai water buffalo or Thai swamp buffalo is a large breed of water buffalo indigenous to Thailand.

References

Animal breeds originating in Thailand
Water buffalo breeds